The Independent Party is a classical liberal and anti-elitist political party in Denmark. It was formed in 1953 as a breakaway party from Venstre as a protest against the established centre-right parties' cooperation with the Social Democrats. The Independent Party later got an anti-elitist character.

Election results

Parliament (Folketing)

Municipal elections

External links
Official website

Liberal parties in Denmark
Political parties established in 1953
1953 establishments in Denmark
Classical liberal parties